The following is a list, ordered by length of reign, of the monarchs of the United Kingdom of Great Britain and Northern Ireland (1927–present), the United Kingdom of Great Britain and Ireland (1801–1927), the Kingdom of Great Britain (1707–1800), the Kingdom of England (871–1707), the Kingdom of Scotland (878–1707), the Kingdom of Ireland (1542–1800), and the Principality of Wales (1216–1542).

Queen Elizabeth II became the longest-reigning monarch in British history on 9 September 2015 when she surpassed the reign of her great-great-grandmother Queen Victoria. On 6 February 2017, she became the first British monarch to celebrate a Sapphire Jubilee, commemorating 65 years on the throne. On 6 February 2022, Elizabeth II became the first British monarch to reign for 70 years, and large-scale celebrations for her Platinum Jubilee occurred on 2 to 5 June. Elizabeth II died on 8 September 2022, at the age of 96 years and 140 days, after reigning for 70 years and 214 days.

Elizabeth II: the longest-reigning monarch 

On 9 September 2015, Elizabeth II became the longest-reigning British monarch and the longest-reigning female monarch in world history. On 23 May 2016, her reign surpassed the claimed reign of James Francis Edward Stuart (nicknamed "the Old Pretender"). On 6 February 2022 (at the age of ), she became the first British monarch to reign for 70 years and celebrate a platinum jubilee.

Ten longest-reigning British monarchs 
These are the ten longest-reigning monarchs in the British Isles for whom there is reliable recorded evidence.

Complete list of the unitary monarchy

Great Britain 
On 1 May 1707, under the Acts of Union 1707, the Kingdom of England united with the Kingdom of Scotland as the Kingdom of Great Britain.

United Kingdom 
On 1 January 1801 the Kingdom of Great Britain united with the Kingdom of Ireland to become the United Kingdom of Great Britain and Ireland, becoming the United Kingdom of Great Britain and Northern Ireland by Act of Parliament in 1927 following the creation of the Irish Free State in 1922.

Complete list of the kingdoms

England 

Includes English monarchs from the installation of Alfred the Great as King of Wessex in 871 to Anne (House of Stuart) and the Acts of Union on 1 May 1707, when the crown became part of the Kingdom of Great Britain.

Scotland 

Includes Scottish monarchs from the installation of Kenneth I (House of Alpin) in 848 to Anne (House of Stuart) and the Acts of Union on 1 May 1707, when the crown became part of the Kingdom of Great Britain.

Ireland 

The High King of Ireland (846–1198) was primarily a titular ruler (with the exception of Ruaidrí Ua Conchobair who was regarded as the first "King of Ireland"). The later Kingdom of Ireland (1542–1800) came into being under the Crown of Ireland Act 1542, the long title of which was "An Act that the King of England, his Heirs and Successors, be Kings of Ireland". In 1801 the Irish crown became part of the United Kingdom of Great Britain and Ireland.

List of the Principalities

Gwynedd (incomplete list) 

The Principality (or Kingdom) of Gwynedd (5th century–1216) was based in northwest Wales, its rulers were repeatedly acclaimed as "King of the Britons" before losing their power in civil wars or Saxon and Norman invasions. In 1216 it was superseded by the title Principality of Wales, although the new title was not first used until the 1240s.

Wales (complete list) 

The Principality of Wales (1216–1542) was a client state of England for much of its history, except for brief periods when it was de facto independent under a Welsh Prince of Wales (see House of Aberffraw). From 1301 it was first used as a title of the English (and later British) heir apparent. The Laws in Wales Acts 1535–1542 formally incorporated all of Wales within the Kingdom of England.

Charles III was the longest-serving Prince of Wales, with a tenure of 64 years and 44 days since his proclamation as such on 26 July 1958 until his accession to the throne on 8 September 2022.

See also 

 Monarchy of the United Kingdom
 List of British monarchs
 List of British monarchy records
 List of longest-reigning monarchs
 Family tree of the British royal family

Notes

References 

Longest-reigning
British
 
Longest reigning British monarchs